Duke Otto II of Brunswick-Osterode (1396–1452) was a son of Duke Frederick I of Brunswick-Osterode and his wife, Adelaide of Anhalt-Zerbst.  He succeeded his father as duke of Brunswick-Osterode in 1421 and ruled jointly with his first cousin once removed Albert II.

Otto was married to Schonetta (d. 1436), a daughter of Count John I of Nassau-Weilburg.  This marriage was childless.

Ancestors 

Dukes of Brunswick-Lüneburg
1396 births
1452 deaths
15th-century German people